Mitchell Krueger and Jack Sock were the defending champions but chose not to defend their title.

Christian Harrison and Peter Polansky won the title after defeating JC Aragone and Nicolás Barrientos 6–2, 6–3 in the final.

Seeds

Draw

References

External links
 Main draw

Orlando Open II - Doubles